KWYN may refer to:

 KWYN (AM), a radio station (1400 AM) licensed to Wynne, Arkansas, United States
 KWYN-FM, a radio station (92.5 FM) licensed to Wynne, Arkansas